Stephanie Smith is an American contemporary Christian music singer-songwriter. She is signed to Gotee Records. Her first studio album, Not Afraid, was released on May 27, 2008, digitally and in stores on December 23, 2008. She received national attention on the Winter Wonder Slam tour with TobyMac.

Biography
Stephanie Smith graduated from Greenville College in Illinois in 2006. It was at Greenville College that she first met Gotee Records manager TobyMac, while performing at the annual AgapeFest. Toby then signed her to the record label. She has written a book with Suzy Weibel titled Crossroads: The Teenage Girl's Guide to Emotional Wounds, which was released on June 1, 2008. She is featured on the House of Heroes song "God Save Us the Foolish Kings" which was released in 2011. In November 2012, Smith married House of Heroes frontman, Tim Skipper. The two started creating their own music under the name Copperlily and released Love Is a Legend in 2014.

Personal life
Stephanie's work has often been driven by the pain caused by the lack of a relationship with her father, whom she loved dearly but was absent from her life from a very early age. She performed "Piece by Piece" on NBC's The Voice as a tribute to her experience.  Stephanie's father passed away in October 2020.

Discography
Albums
 2008: Not Afraid
 2009: Stephanie Smith EP
 2010: I Celebrate The Day EP

Singles
 "Superstar", No. 3 New And Active at CHR radio
 "Not Afraid", No. 19 on R&R's Christian CHR chart, for the week of February 16, 2008
 "Renew Me"
 "In My Eyes", No. 8 on R&R's Christian Rock chart
 "God Save Us the Foolish Kings" (featured by House of Heroes) (2010)
 "Letting Go" (2012)

Compilation appearances
 2007: "Superstar", Gotee Ladies (Gotee Records)
 2009: "Not Afraid", ConGRADulations! Class of 2009 (Interlinc)
 2010: "I Celebrate The Day" and "Jingle Bell Rock", Tis The Season to Be Gotee (Gotee)

References

External links
 

Performers of contemporary Christian music
Greenville College people
Living people
Gotee Records artists
21st-century American singers
American performers of Christian music
21st-century American women singers
Year of birth missing (living people)